Lake is the name of some places in the U.S. state of Wisconsin:
Lake, Marinette County, Wisconsin, a town
Lake, Milwaukee County, Wisconsin, a former town
Lake, Price County, Wisconsin, a town

See also
Lake Wisconsin (disambiguation)